Annibale Magalotti (died 1551) was a Roman Catholic prelate who served as Bishop of Alessano (1549–1551).

Biography
On 18 January 1549, Annibale Magalotti was appointed during the papacy of Pope Paul III as Bishop of Alessano. He served as Bishop of Alessano until his death in 1551.

References

External links and additional sources
 (for Chronology of Bishops) 
 (for Chronology of Bishops) 

16th-century Italian Roman Catholic bishops
1551 deaths
Bishops appointed by Pope Paul III